Interstate 390 (I-390) is a  north–south auxiliary Interstate Highway located entirely within New York in the United States. The southern terminus of the route is at the Southern Tier Expressway (I-86 and New York State Route 17 [NY 17]) in the town of Avoca. Its northern terminus is at I-490 (Western Expressway) in Gates, just west of Rochester. North of I-490, the expressway continues as NY 390 to the Lake Ontario State Parkway in Greece. I-390 connects to its parent, I-90 (New York State Thruway), in Henrietta, a southern suburb of Rochester. The route is known as the Genesee Expressway from Avoca to I-590 in Brighton, where it becomes part of the Rochester Outer Loop.

In addition to serving Rochester, I-390 serves as an important connecting route between the Rochester metropolitan area and Corning and the rest of the Southern Tier of New York. The freeway also serves several smaller communities between Corning and Rochester, including the Livingston County villages of Dansville and Geneseo. I-390 effectively replaced US Route 15 (US 15) and parallels NY 15, US 15's de facto successor, north of Corning.

The first section of the Genesee Expressway opened in the late 1960s, extending from Wayland in the east to Dansville in the west. The entirety of the then-proposed highway was designated as New York State Route 401 (NY 401) in 1970 but redesignated as I-390 . More sections of the freeway opened throughout the 1970s, and I-390 was extended northwestward to cover the southwestern quadrant of the Rochester Outer Loop in 1980 following the elimination of NY 47. I-390 was completed in the early 1980s.

Route description

In its southern sections, which account for most of the highway's mileage, I-390 is a lightly trafficked freeway of two lanes in either direction going through minimally populated rural areas. Closer to Rochester, it becomes wider to accommodate the increased traffic it handles in the city itself.

Steuben and Livingston counties
I-390 begins as westbound traffic on the concurrent routes of I-86 and NY 17 proceeds below the overpass carrying those two routes to the west, at an interchange just east of the village of Avoca in Steuben County. The expressway heads northwest through the narrow valley of the Cohocton River to Cohocton, where the river leaves the expressway and heads north toward the hamlet of Atlanta. I-390 climbs gradually as it continues past Cohocton, eventually turning due west as it descends to an interchange with NY 21 south of Wayland. This exit is also the southern terminus of NY 15, which eventually parallels the Interstate further north.

The road climbs again as it makes a gentle bend and widens as it crosses the Livingston County line just south of Dansville and north of Stony Brook State Park. Descending again, it returns to its northwestern heading. North of the village, it climbs to the west side of the wide valley of Canaseraga Creek, giving the roadway a view over the area known locally as the Flats. NY 36 begins to parallel the highway closely, with NY 63 on the far side of the Flats. Just south of the hamlet of Sonyea, NY 36 crosses at a diamond interchange. I-390 turns northeast briefly but resumes its northwest course soon afterward. At this point, the highway follows more level ground, with woods and swamps mostly replacing farmland in the surrounding landscape.

After passing rest areas on either side, I-390 reaches the NY 408 exit adjacent to the American Rock Salt mine at Hampton Corners. Here, most traffic bound for the Buffalo area exits to go west to Mount Morris, visible across the Flats from the freeway, where it follows NY 36 north. To the immediate east of the exit, NY 408 ends at NY 63, which carries traffic from the Interstate into Geneseo, the county seat.  north of the exit, Canaseraga Creek drains into the Genesee River on the road's west side.

The expressway continues north through Livingston County to Geneseo, which I-390 skirts to the south and east. While there is no exit for Geneseo on the part of the freeway that encroaches the village, exit 8, an interchange with US 20 Alternate (US 20A) east of Geneseo, provides the connection. Also accessible from the junction is the hamlet of Lakeville, situated off to the east at the junction of US 20A and NY 15. I-390 continues on, encountering NY 15 north of Lakeville and southeast of Avon. From here north to Rochester, I-390 and NY 15 follow closely parallel alignments. Both highways meet US 20 and NY 5 east of Avon prior to crossing into Monroe County.

Monroe County
As I-390 heads north through the southern extents of the county, the surroundings become more residential and commercial in nature. The freeway meets NY 15 and NY 251 in Rush ahead of an interchange with both the New York State Thruway (I-90) and NY 253 in southern Henrietta. Past the thruway, the transition from the rural landscapes of the Southern Tier and Finger Lakes to residential and commercial areas is completed as I-390 continues into the suburbs of Rochester and the commercial center of Henrietta. Roughly  from NY 253, I-390 has an exit leading to Hylan Drive, a through street leading to The Marketplace Mall. Farther north, I-390 meets both NY 15A and NY 252 in equally commercialized areas before entering Brighton.

Shortly after entering Brighton, I-390 crosses over the Erie Canal and meets the southern terminus of I-590 at a large semi-directional T interchange located adjacent to the canal and South Clinton Avenue. The latter of the two passes through the eastern half of the junction, crossing over I-590 but passing under the ramps connecting I-590 south to I-390 south and I-390 north to I-590 north. Past the exit, I-390 turns to the west, joining the Rochester Outer Loop and crossing back over the canal ahead of an interchange with NY 15 and NY 15A. After passing under NY 15, the freeway begins to run along the southern edge of the Erie Canal, here delimiting the southern city limits of Rochester.

For the next mile, I-390 follows a more northwesterly alignment along the northeastern edge of the Greater Rochester International Airport grounds. It meets Brooks Avenue (NY 204) at the northern edge of the grounds before leaving the airport area and curving more to the north, matching changes in the Erie Canal's alignment as both entities proceed around the southwestern edge of the city. Now in Gates, I-390 crosses over the Rochester and Southern Railroad just south of another partial cloverleaf interchange with NY 33A. I-390 ends here; however, the freeway continues northward toward Greece as NY 390.

History

Construction on a limited-access highway between Wayland and Dansville began . The highway opened to traffic  as a realignment of NY 245. On January 1, 1970, the expressway became part of NY 401, a designation that also extended south to the town of Avoca and north to the city of Rochester along the Genesee Expressway, a proposed freeway utilizing the US 15 corridor. NY 401 was added to the Interstate Highway System and redesignated I-390 . As initially planned, I-390 would continue north into Downtown Rochester and end at I-490 while the entirety of the Rochester Outer Loop south of I-490 would become I-590.

Construction began  on the portion of I-390 between NY 17 near the village of Avoca and NY 21 south of Wayland. It opened to traffic . By 1977, work had begun on the leg between NY 251 in Rush and the New York State Thruway (I-90) in Henrietta. This section was completed by 1981, as were the Dansville–Groveland (NY 36), Avon–Rush, and thruway–Hylan Drive segments. The remainder of I-390 in Monroe County up to the modern I-390/I-590 interchange was built , and the final gap in the expressway from NY 36 to US 20 in Livingston County opened .

By the late 1970s, in the face of community opposition, the proposed extension of I-390 into Downtown Rochester was scrapped. Instead, the state of New York began to look into the possibility of changing the designations that were assigned to the outer loop. In one proposal submitted to the American Association of State Highway and Transportation Officials in the late 1970s, I-590 would be truncated to begin at the then-proposed junction with I-390 in Brighton. The rest of the loop south of I-490, meanwhile, would become part of an extended I-390, which would continue north past I-490 to the outer loop's northwestern end at the Lake Ontario State Parkway. NY 47, the then-current designation for much of the outer loop, would be eliminated.

Most of the plans went into effect when the NY 47 designation was eliminated on March 18, 1980. The southern half of the outer loop was signed as planned; however, I-390 and I-590 were modified to end at their junctions with I-490. While NY 47 was officially assigned to the entirety of the outer loop prior to its removal, only the portion from NY 383 north to I-490 was actually once part of NY 47.

On February 10, 2008, whiteout conditions caused a 36-car pileup near the Scottsville Road exit, which led to a 17-year-old girl's death. Firefighters had to climb over cars and cut off roofs to get to people. More than 20 people were taken to the hospital.

On July 17, 2011, a tour bus heading northbound from Washington DC to Niagara Falls crashed between the Avoca and Cohocton exits, killing two and injuring at least 35 others. Preliminary investigation listed a blown-out tire as a possible cause of the crash.

Future
However, no official moves have been forwarded to fulfill this.

Exit list

See also

New York State Route 390 for exits 21–27

References

External links

90-3
90-3
3
Transportation in Livingston County, New York
Transportation in Monroe County, New York
Transportation in Steuben County, New York